Rajarshi Memorial Higher Secondary School is a senior secondary school situated in the village of Vadavucode, Kerala, India. The school was started by social worker Kadayath Pyli Abraham. 

The teacher Sri K A Abraham, popularly known as Kurisinkal Abraham, was the son in law of the founder. He  played a leadership  role in the school during the 1960s till 1973. In 1969, Sri K A Abraham - then Head Master -  was honoured by the country by selecting him as  'the best teacher of the year'. Sri V V Giri, President of India conferred on him the honour during the Independence Day celebrations at the Red Fort, New Delhi on 15 August, 1969.

History
The founder of Rajarshi Memorial Higher Secondary School was Kadayath Pyli Abraham. Alice Paul, daughter in law of Mr Kadyath Paili Abraham later became the principal of the school following his early demise in 1940. His daughter Dr Elizabeth was also the manager of the school. He came from a Syrian Christian family from Vadavucode. The ownership of the school was handed over to Catholicate and M D Schools corporate management by his son K A Paul in 1989.

The school was given the name of Rama Varma XV (27 December 1852 – 1932) (Raja Rama Varma), also known as Rajarshi, of Cochin state. Raja Rama Varma's son Rao Sahib I.N. Menon allowed starting an upper primary school at Vadavucode.

Location
The school is situated in a small village, called Vadavucode, 21 km from Kochi. Nearest villages are Pancode, Puthencruz, Kolenchery.

Courses 
Upper primary and high school sections along with higher secondary courses under the following streams.

Availability of seats in batches of higher secondary classes:

* Including SC/ST and Sports Quota seats
** Reserved for Orthodox students on the basis of merit 
*** Admitted by a committee appointed by corporate manager

See also 
 Rajarshi Memorial Higher Secondary School, Aloor, Thrissur District

References

External links 
 rmhss

High schools and secondary schools in Kerala
Schools in Ernakulam district
Educational institutions established in 1938
1938 establishments in India